Andrew Justerine Deometrie van Wyk (born 4 August 1989) is a South African professional rugby union player for the  in the Currie Cup and the Rugby Challenge. His regular position is winger or centre.

Career

Youth and Varsity Cup rugby

He was selected for several youth tournaments by his local provincial side, . In 2005, he was selected in their Under-16 squad for the Grant Khomo Week tournament and in both 2006 and 2007, he was selected for their Under-18 Craven Week side. Towards the end of 2007, he was also a member of the  side that participated in the Under-19 Provincial Championship.

He played for the  side in the 2008, 2009 and 2010 Under-21 Provincial Championships. He scored six tries in 2010, one behind the joint-leading try-scorers for the Leopards U21 side, SP Marais and Joubert Engelbrecht.

He played Varsity Cup rugby for four consecutive seasons between 2009 and 2012. He scored two tries in nine appearances in his maiden season in the competition in 2009. One try followed in both 2010 (in five appearances) and 2011 (in seven starts), but 2012 was the season when he sprung to prominence with his performances, scoring nine tries in eight starts to finish the season as joint-top try scorer in the competition with 's Chrysander Botha.

Leopards

Van Wyk was named on the bench for the ' 2011 Currie Cup Premier Division match against  and came on with a few minutes remaining in the match to make his first class and Currie Cup debut.

The Leopards suffered relegation during that Currie Cup season, so Van Wyk's seven appearances the following season were in the 2012 Currie Cup First Division.

With Van Wyk not being involved in the Varsity Cup for the first since 2008, he was part of the  side that played in the 2013 Vodacom Cup. He played four times without scoring any tries.

Border Bulldogs

Falcons

References

1989 births
Living people
People from Siyathemba Local Municipality
Cape Coloureds
South African rugby union players
Rugby union centres
Rugby union wings
Border Bulldogs players
Falcons (rugby union) players
Leopards (rugby union) players
Rugby union players from the Northern Cape